Old Blue was a Chatham Island robin (also known as black robin) who at one time was the only fertile female of the species left, and who has been credited with being the savior of her species. She lived for approximately 13 years.

Background
By 1979, there were just five of the Chatham Island robins left. By the time the Wildlife service intervened in 1980, she was the only female capable of laying fertile eggs. From her, the species was saved. She is the ancestor of all living black robins, and lived from 1970 to 1983.

History
In 1983, she was moved to Rangatira Island so that the other breeding female, Old Green who wasn't directly related to her would have a chance to produce offspring and the remaining genetic diversity could be preserved. Sadly none of Old Green's offspring managed to survive to the stage where they could breed. That resulted in Old Green's genes being lost. Through Old Blue's breeding period, she managed to raise eleven chicks. All of the Black Robins today are descended from Old Blue and male breeder, Old Yellow. By early 2013, the Chatham Island robin population was approximately 250.

A book about her, Old Blue. The Rarest Bird in the World by Mary Taylor won an award in 1994 for the Best Children's Non-fiction Title at New Zealand's National Book Awards.

Memorial
A plaque dedicated to her is situated at the Chatham Island airport. She is also the only bird to have its death officially announced in a government parliament.

Film
 Seven Black Robins – Produced by Michael Stedman, 1981

References

black robin
black robin

Bird conservation
1970 animal births
1983 animal deaths
Individual animals in New Zealand